The 2017 Uganda Marburg virus outbreak was confirmed by the World Health Organization (WHO) on 20 October 2017 after there had been an initial fatality due to the virus.

The Ugandan Ministry of Health indicated that an individual had died of the virus on 19 October; the following day, 20 October, WHO released a press statement regarding the matter. The eastern part of the country is the affected area where the cases have occurred. On 22 October, it was reported that 55 individuals were under surveillance for the virus. On 25 October, the number of individuals rose to 155 in terms of contact tracing

Virology and epidemiology

According to the Centers for Disease Control and Prevention (CDC), the Marburg virus was first recognised in 1967. In terms of diagnosis the presentation is similar to malaria or typhoid fever and therefore not easy to identify (diagnose).

The Marburg virus is considered a filovirus, which is the same as the Ebola virus in terms of viral classification. According to Mehedi, et al. macrophages, monocytes, and dendritic cells, are what the virus attacks due to their importance in the human bodies normal mechanism

According to the World Health Organization there is currently no treatment for the disease.
As of 11 November 2017, according to the Ministry of Health no new cases have been reported to this point the report originates from Kampala.

On 8 December the World Health Organization declared the end to the outbreak in the country of Uganda due to two 21-day quarantine periods

Other outbreaks

The table lists a subset of the Marburg virus disease outbreaks, which have occurred specifically in Uganda:

See also
 Marburg virus disease
 Marburg virus
 Filoviridae

References

Further reading

External links
 WHO

Marburg Uganda 2017
Marburgviruses
Marburg
Marburg Uganda
Marburg 2017
Uganda Marburg